Pseudoduganella violaceinigra is a mesophilic bacterium of the genus Duganella in the Oxalobacteraceae family which was isolated from forest soil in Yunnan Province in China.

References

Burkholderiales
Bacteria described in 2004